Ab Zalu-ye Sofla-ye Neqareh Khaneh (also Romanized as Āb Zālū-ye Soflá-ye Neqāreh Khāneh; also known as Āb Zālū-ye Pā’īn, Āb Zālū-ye Soflá, and Belī Angūrī) is a village in Kabgian Rural District, Kabgian District, Dana County, Kohgiluyeh and Boyer-Ahmad Province, Iran. At the 2006 census, its population was 36, in 10 families.

References 

Populated places in Dana County